Archibald Walker was a Scotland international rugby union player.

Rugby Union career

Amateur career

He played for West of Scotland.

He played for Fettesian-Lorettonians in 1883 while still with West of Scotland, alongside his brother James Walker who was named as an Oxford University player.

He also played rugby for Oxford University.

Provincial career

He played for Glasgow District against Edinburgh District in the inter-city match of 3 December 1881.

He played for West of Scotland District in their match against East of Scotland District on 28 January 1882.

International career

He was capped five times for Scotland between 1881 and 1883.

Other sports

He rowed in the college eight at Oxford University.

Business career

He was a director of the Distillers Company Ltd. for 32 years.

He was Deputy Chairman of the Clydesdale Bank between 1923 and 1940.

He was a member of the Royal Company of Archers; and a member of the King's Bodyguard for Scotland.

Family

He was born to Archibald Walker (1815–80) and Mary MacFarlane Smith (1826-1913). He had siblings:- James Walker (1859-1923), who was also capped for Scotland; Mary Smith Walker; and Agnes Walker.

He married Adelaide Orr Thomson (1875-1924). They had a son George Edward Orr Walker and daughter Adelaide Mary Orr Walker. George became a Lieutenant Colonel in the army, but continued to use the Major rank as he was better known with that rank, and ran for the Westminster Parliament in 1945 for the Conservative Party in the Kilmarnock constituency. However it was won by Clarice Shaw, a music teacher and member of Troon town council, for the Labour Party.

References

Sources

 Bath, Richard (ed.) The Scotland Rugby Miscellany (Vision Sports Publishing Ltd, 2007 )

1858 births
1945 deaths
Rugby union players from Glasgow
Scottish rugby union players
Scotland international rugby union players
West of Scotland District (rugby union) players
Glasgow District (rugby union) players
West of Scotland FC players
Fettesian-Lorretonian rugby union players
Oxford University RFC players
Rugby union forwards